The 1899 New Richmond tornado was an estimated F5 tornado which formed on the early evening of Monday, June 12, 1899 and tore a 45-mile path of destruction through St. Croix, Polk and Barron counties in west-central Wisconsin. It left 117 people dead, twice as many injured, and hundreds homeless. The worst devastation brought by the tornado was at the city of New Richmond, Wisconsin, which took a direct hit from the storm (in which brings the name of such). Over half the town was left in ruins by the tornado, which also caused minor damage to several other communities in the area. More than $300,000 (USD) ($ in ) in damage was reported. As of 2019, it ranks as the ninth deadliest tornado in United States history, as well as the deadliest ever recorded in Wisconsin.

Event description
June 12, 1899, was the day of the Gollmar Brothers Circus, which drew hundreds of visitors in addition to the town's 1,600 inhabitants. Around 3:00 p.m., clouds began to build, and the sky became dark. As the circus ended for the day, around 4:30 PM a heavy rain with some hail began to fall. The rain let up around 5:00 PM, and people began to head home for the day. By 6:00 PM, the streets of New Richmond were full of tourists, travellers and residents.

The tornado was reported to have first touched down around 5:30 PM, about five miles south of Hudson, on the eastern bank of Lake St. Croix. The tornado was described as a "boiling cloud" which seemed to skirt the hills to the east of Lake St. Croix and then began moving off to the northeast. Passing clear of Hudson and following both the Willow River and the Omaha Railroad, the tornado swept away several farms near the rural communities of Burkhardt and Boardman as it travelled northeast. Four fatalities were reported at Boardman. 55-year-old Kate Heffron was the first reported fatality, as she was killed when the tornado demolished her home and farm. The home and farm of 70-year-old Louisa Hurd also sustained a direct hit, as Ms. Hurd and 13-year-old Gertie Wears were both killed when her home was swept away. Wears had stopped in along with her father and brother to visit, both of whom managed to reach the cellar before the storm hit. John Neitge, a young farmer from Deer Park who had been driving through with his intended bride, had also stopped at the Hurd farm to seek shelter from the storm. He was struck and killed by flying debris, while she was uninjured.

There was little warning in New Richmond. The tornado was illuminated by lightning, but it was visible for only a few minutes before it reached the town, as the view was largely obstructed by buildings and large trees. Initially, several of the town's residents recalled hearing a faint rumble in the distance which many mistook for the sound of a train passing through the nearby. Before long the tornado became more visible, and those who came to realize the danger approaching began to alert those around them. Panic ensued in the streets as people scrambled to take shelter. Despite the best efforts of the storm's early spotters, a great many of the town's residents were not fully aware of the oncoming storm until it was almost upon them. Shortly after 6:00 PM, the tornado tore into the southwest corner of town. This neighborhood was where many of the town's wealthiest and most influential residents lived, many of them having first come to the area as pioneers from New England in the 1850s. They included the owners of some of New Richmond's most prominent businesses, residing in stately homes built in styles derived from those seen back east. Within a few moments as many as fifty homes were leveled and swept away in this area.

The greatest destruction caused was to the town's business district, a three-block stretch of Main Street between First and Fourth Street lined with stores, offices and tenements built of brick and stone. It was here that a large majority of the fatalities occurred, as many of those who thought they would be safe within the confines of the masonry structures were killed by cascades of falling heavy debris, as the buildings on Main Street were flattened or swept away. Several fatalities occurred when a dry goods store was swept from its foundation, and people sheltering in the basement were pelted with debris. The city bank was destroyed, and a 1.5-ton safe from the building was thrown a full block away. The Nicollet Hotel, a newly constructed three-story brick building located adjacent to the Willow River, was levelled and largely swept from its foundation, killing at least five people. Almost simultaneously, the town's Methodist Church was obliterated, the only remnant being the 1.1-ton cast iron bell, which was found nearly 200 feet from the church foundation. As the tornado cleared Main Street, it tore the iron-frame bridge spanning the Willow River from its supports and threw it onto the adjacent riverbank, leaving it in a twisted heap. The City Hall was flattened, the adjacent water tower sent toppling to the northeast and dumping its contents into First Street, transforming it into a muddy deluge. The tornado then moved into the east side of New Richmond, where many of the city's working-class residents lived. Almost every home in this residential area was obliterated, leaving the neighbourhood virtually unrecognizable, with only scattered debris and empty house foundations left behind. Extreme damage to large trees occurred in this area as well, some of which were stripped clean of all bark and limbs. Within a period of roughly seven to ten minutes, over half of New Richmond was laid to ruins.

After departing New Richmond, the tornado moved on toward the northeast, continuing along a course almost parallel to the Omaha Railroad line, with most of its destruction after that point confined to rural areas, with only two fatalities occurring north of town. The tornado struck several farms in the Stanton area, passing barely a mile north of the village of Deer Park before crossing into Polk County. The storm came within two miles of the village of Clear Lake, proving to be a great scare for its residents as it reminded many of a similar tornado which struck Clear Lake in September 1884. A large number of farms in the area suffered considerable damage, and many families were left homeless. One farmer, Sam Olson was killed instantly when the tornado flattened his farmstead, leaving his wife and son gravely injured. Northeast of Clear Lake, the tornado tore through the logging community of Pineville, where another farmer, Michael Kennetz, was killed when his home was swept away. Several homes and farms in the vicinity of the hamlet of Richardson and the village of Clayton were blown away, leaving several families destitute. The storm continued east into Barron County, where the farming community of Arland sustained a direct hit, with virtually the entire settlement being demolished, but no fatalities or serious injuries being reported. The tornado dissipated a few miles southwest of the town of Barron, although the storm was still strong enough to cause a considerable amount of damage to the town.

Aftermath 
Because the storm had blown down telegraph lines in the area, two riders immediately set off for Roberts, ten miles to the south, and sent messages into St. Paul with news of the tornado. Altogether, the tornado and the subsequent fires that raged throughout the following night destroyed the entire business district along with more than half the residences in town, which combined added up to more than 300 buildings. The only significant surviving structures were the Lumber and Roller Mills located on the banks of the Willow River, the latter of which was narrowly missed by the tornado, the town's public school and the Catholic Church, which acted as either makeshift shelters or morgues. Only the extreme northwestern and southeastern portions of the city were spared. The town's electrical plant and water facilities were destroyed, so fires ran rampant through the scattered debris. Many bodies found in the aftermath were burnt beyond recognition— it was impossible to tell if they died from the tornado or from being trapped and burned alive.

In the days after the tornado, the list of those killed in the tornado gradually grew, as several who had been injured later died in various St. Paul hospitals. On June 22, 57-year-old Ward Gould died from complications caused by internal injuries sustained in the storm, officially bringing the death toll to 117; four at Boardman, two in Polk County, and the remainder in the vicinity of New Richmond, including five victims who were never identified. 66 were residents of New Richmond, another 31 had resided in the adjacent townships of Richmond, Stanton and Erin Prairie, and the remainder were mostly from other communities nearby, such as Hudson, Stillwater, Star Prairie, Baldwin and Glenwood City. Among the dead were 26 children under the age of 16, including a 10-year-old boy whose body was never found.

The town was so damaged that it had to be essentially rebuilt. Damage claims exceeded $300,000 ($7 million in 2006 dollars), however, damages may have been as high as $600,000 ($14 million in 2006 dollars).

Historical significance 
The tornado that struck New Richmond is estimated to be an F5 on the original Fujita scale, and would today be categorized an EF5 on the Enhanced Fujita scale, with winds in excess of 200 miles per hour, making it the third of only six F5 tornadoes ever recorded in Wisconsin. Surveys of the damage caused at New Richmond and elsewhere determined the tornado had a damage path of roughly 400-500 yards, or slightly over a quarter-mile in width.

In terms of fatalities, the New Richmond Tornado presently ranks as the ninth deadliest tornado in United States history. At the time of its occurrence, it ranked as the third deadliest tornado in American history, outflanked only by the 1840 Great Natchez Tornado and the 1896 St. Louis-East St. Louis tornado. Since 1899, the record has only been surpassed six times, those being the Amite-Purvis Tornado in 1908, the Tri-State Tornado in 1925, the Tupelo and Gainesville tornadoes in 1936, the 1947 Woodward Tornado and most recently the 2011 Joplin Tornado.

According to the research compiled by meteorologist and tornado expert Thomas P. Grazulis, the New Richmond Tornado was the first determined F/EF5 in American history to cause a death toll exceeding 100, as the rating for the Natchez tornado has never been officially determined and the St. Louis-East St. Louis tornado ranked as only an F4. In addition, the Amite-Purvis (1908 Dixie tornado outbreak), and Gainesville (1936 Tupelo–Gainesville tornado outbreak), tornadoes have also both been classified as only F4 tornadoes, making the New Richmond Tornado the 9th deadliest F/EF5 in American history.

See also
 List of F5 and EF5 tornadoes

References

External links 

The Tornado at New Richmond, Wis. (PDF) Monthly Weather Review

N
N
N
N
1899 natural disasters in the United States
June 1899 events